Lena Sadick is a former Hong Kong international lawn and indoor bowler.

Bowls career
Sadick won a gold medal in the triples with Rae O'Donnell and Linda King and double silver in the fours with O'Donnell, King and Joan Humphreys and the team event (Taylor Trophy) at the 1981 World Outdoor Bowls Championship in Toronto .

References

Hong Kong female bowls players
Living people
Bowls World Champions
Date of birth missing (living people)
Year of birth missing (living people)